Ellen Beth Barre Spiegel (born in 1962 in New York City, New York) is a businesswoman and American politician who was a Democratic member of the Nevada Assembly, first elected November 4, 2008, representing District 21 in Henderson for two years, and again elected on November 6, 2012, where she represented District 20 for eight years, which during her time in office was split between Henderson and unincorporated Clark County. Spiegel has lived in Henderson, Nevada's second-largest city, since 2001.

Spiegel is a small-business owner, was a longtime Board member of Easter Seals Nevada, and the winner of awards from organizations including the Multiple Sclerosis Society (2020 Legislator of the Year), the March of Dimes (2015 Peggy Pierce Advocacy Award), the Urban Chamber of Commerce (2016 Women in Politics Award), the Nevada Women's Lobby (2020 Woman of Impact and 2010 Rising Star Award), and others. Spiegel was Chair of the Assembly Committee on Commerce and Labor (2019), Assistant Majority Whip in the 79th Legislative Session (2017), and when in office was one of fewer than twenty Democratic Party women to ever hold an Assembly leadership position in Nevada. She also is on the board of directors of the bipartisan National Association of Jewish Legislators (NAJL), where she was Secretary for four years and is now spearheading the creation of the NAJL Alumni Group.

Legislative Session Committees
2019 Legislative Session:  Commerce and Labor (Chair); Taxation (Vice Chair); Ways & Means (subcommittee Vice Chair).
2017 Legislative Session:  Ways & Means; Taxation; Transportation (Vice Chair). 
2015 Legislative Session:  Health & Human Services; Government Affairs; Transportation.
2013 Legislative Session:  Health & Human Services (Vice Chair); Judiciary; Transportation.
2009 Legislative Session:  Health & Human Services; Government Affairs; Transportation.

Education
Spiegel earned her BS in Consumer Economics and Public Policy from Cornell University.

Elections

2022 Spiegel was the Democratic nominee for Nevada State Controller, having won the Democratic primary with 67.29%. She had the support of incumbent Controller Catherine Byrne, who chose to not seek reelection. The Republican candidate was Assemblyman Andy Matthews, who won the race with 50.06% of the vote.
2020 Spiegel gave up her Assembly seat to run in the June 9, 2020 Democratic Primary for the open Senate District 7 seat, which was also contested by fellow Assembly member Richard Carrillo and former Nevada Democratic Party Chair Roberta Lange. Lange won the race with 3,672 votes (38.3%) to Spiegel's 3,540 votes (36.9%), with Carrillo getting 2,384 votes (24.8%). 
2018 Spiegel was unopposed for the June 12, 2018 Democratic Primary, and won the November 6, 2018 General election with 12,029 votes (62.1%) against Republican nominee Michael McDonald.
2016 Spiegel was challenged in the Democratic Primary by real estate attorney Darren Welsh. Spiegel prevailed, garnering 76.98% of the vote to Welsh's 23.02%. Spiegel then defeated Republican Carol Linton, who also was her 2014 opponent, in the general election, winning this time by a margin of 13,548 (60.60%) to 8,807 (39.40%). 
2014 Spiegel was unopposed for the June 10, 2014 Democratic Primary, and won the November 4, 2014 General election with 5,664 votes (54.26%) against Republican nominee Carol Linton.
2012 Redistricted to District 20, and with Republican Assemblyman Cresent Hardy redistricted to District 19, Spiegel won the three-way June 12, 2012 Democratic Primary with 52.75% of the vote, Nevada State Board of Education member Gloria Bonaventura came in second with 26.29%. Spiegel won the November 6, 2012 General election with 12,894 votes (61.07%) against Republican nominee Eric Mendoza.
2010 Spiegel was unopposed for the June 8, 2010 Democratic Primary, but lost the November 2, 2010 General election to Republican nominee Mark Sherwood.
2008 Challenging incumbent Republican Assemblyman Bob L. Beers for the District 21 seat, a seat that had a Republican-registration majority and had never been won by a Democratic woman, Spiegel was unopposed for the August 12, 2008 Democratic Primary, and won the November 4, 2008 General election with 10,719 votes (50.87%) against Republican nominee Jon Ozark, who had defeated Beers in the Republican Primary.

References

External links
Official page at the Nevada Legislature
Campaign site

1962 births
21st-century American Jews
21st-century American politicians
21st-century American women politicians
Cornell University alumni
Jewish American state legislators in Nevada
Living people
Democratic Party members of the Nevada Assembly
People from Henderson, Nevada
Politicians from New York City
Women state legislators in Nevada